The 2002–03 OPJHL season is the tenth season of the Ontario Provincial Junior A Hockey League (OPJHL). The thirty-five teams of the North, South, East, and West divisions competed in a 49-game schedule.

Come February, the top eight teams of each division competed for the Frank L. Buckland Trophy, the OPJHL championship.  The winner of the Buckland Cup, the Wellington Dukes, went on to win the Dudley Hewitt Cup as Central Canadian Champions.  The Dukes were not successful in winning the 2003 Royal Bank Cup.

Changes
Parry Sound Shamrocks leave the OPJHL.

Final standings

Note: GP = Games played; W = Wins; L = Losses; OTL = Overtime losses; SL = Shootout losses; GF = Goals for; GA = Goals against; PTS = Points; x = clinched playoff berth; y = clinched division title; z = clinched conference title

2002-03 Frank L. Buckland Trophy Playoffs

Division Quarter-final
Wellington Dukes defeated Peterborough Bees 4-games-to-none
Trenton Sting defeated Bowmanville Eagles 4-games-to-1
Kingston Voyageurs defeated Bancroft Hawks 4-games-to-none
Lindsay Muskies defeated Cobourg Cougars 4-games-to-3
Aurora Tigers defeated Bramalea Blues 4-games-to-none
Newmarket Hurricanes defeated Ajax Axemen 4-games-to-1
Stouffville Spirit defeated Couchiching Terriers 4-games-to-none
Collingwood Blues defeated North York Rangers 4-games-to-2
Milton Merchants defeated Streetsville Derbys 4-games-to-none
Buffalo Lightning defeated Hamilton Kiltys 4-games-to-2
Georgetown Raiders defeated Mississauga Chargers 4-games-to-1
Oakville Blades defeated Burlington Cougars 4-games-to-none
Wexford Raiders defeated Port Hope Predators 4-games-to-1
Markham Waxers defeated Thornhill Rattlers 4-games-to-none
St. Michael's Buzzers defeated Pickering Panthers 4-games-to-none
Oshawa Legionaires defeated Vaughan Vipers 4-games-to-2
Division Semi-final
Wexford Raiders defeated Oshawa Legionaires 4-games-to-2
Markham Waxers defeated St. Michael's Buzzers 4-games-to-2
Wellington Dukes defeated Lindsay Muskies 4-games-to-1
Trenton Sting defeated Kingston Voyageurs 4-games-to-2
Milton Merchants defeated Buffalo Lightning 4-games-to-none
Georgetown Raiders defeated Oakville Blades 4-games-to-3
Aurora Tigers defeated Collingwood Blues 4-games-to-1
Stouffville Spirit defeated Newmarket Hurricanes 4-games-to-3
Division Final
Georgetown Raiders defeated Milton Merchants 4-games-to-3
Aurora Tigers defeated Stouffville Spirit 4-games-to-2
Markham Waxers defeated Wexford Raiders 4-games-to-3
Wellington Dukes defeated Trenton Sting 4-games-to-3
Semi-final
Aurora Tigers defeated Georgetown Raiders 4-games-to-1
Wellington Dukes defeated Markham Waxers 4-games-to-none
Final
Wellington Dukes defeated Aurora Tigers 4-games-to-2

Dudley Hewitt Cup Championship
Hosted by Fort Frances Borderland Thunder in Fort Frances, Ontario.  Wellington Dukes won the event.

Round Robin
Wellington Dukes defeated Thunder Bay Bulldogs (SIJHL) 7-4
Wellington Dukes defeated Fort Frances Borderland Thunder (SIJHL) 7-1
North Bay Skyhawks (NOJHL) defeated Wellington Dukes 2-1
Semi-final
Wellington Dukes defeated Fort Frances Borderland Thunder (SIJHL) 3-2
Final
Wellington Dukes defeated North Bay Skyhawks (NOJHL) 4-0

2003 Royal Bank Cup Championship
Hosted by Charlottetown Abbies in Charlottetown, Prince Edward Island.  The Wellington Dukes lost in the semi-final.

Round Robin
Humboldt Broncos (SJHL) defeated Wellington Dukes 4-1
Camrose Kodiaks (AJHL) defeated Wellington Dukes 7-1
Wellington Dukes defeated Charlottetown Abbies (MJAHL) 1-0 OT
Wellington Dukes defeated Lennoxville Cougars (QJAAAHL) 5-2
Semi-final
Humboldt Broncos (SJHL) defeated Wellington Dukes 3-2

Scoring leaders
Note: GP = Games played; G = Goals; A = Assists; Pts = Points; PIM = Penalty minutes

Players selected in 2003 NHL Entry Draft
Rd 4 #103	Kevin Jarman - Columbus Blue Jackets (Stouffville Spirit)	
Rd 8 #244	Mike Sullivan - Los Angeles Kings	(Stouffville Spirit)
Rd 9 #270	Kevin Harvey - Calgary Flames	(Georgetown Raiders)
Rd 9 #291	Brian Elliott - Ottawa Senators	(Ajax Axemen)

See also
 2003 Royal Bank Cup
 Dudley Hewitt Cup
 List of OJHL seasons
 Northern Ontario Junior Hockey League
 Superior International Junior Hockey League
 Greater Ontario Junior Hockey League
 2002 in ice hockey
 2003 in ice hockey

References

External links
 Official website of the Ontario Junior Hockey League
 Official website of the Canadian Junior Hockey League

Ontario Junior Hockey League seasons
OPJHL